Darrell Campbell (born July 6, 1981 in Chicago, Illinois) is a defensive tackle on the Portland Thunder of the Arena Football League.

Early life
Darrell attended Thornwood High School in South Holland, Illinois, where he was a participant in football, track, wrestling, basketball, soccer and baseball. As a football player, he earned three letters in football, serving as captain and earning team MVP honors each of the last three seasons. He made 67 solo tackles as senior in 1998, along with 13 tackles for loss and four sacks. Played defensive end as sophomore, inside linebacker as junior and nose guard as senior. As a result, he was named USA Today honorable mention prep All-American pick, rated 82nd nationally on Chicago Sun-Times list of top 100 players, named first-team all-state pick in Illinois by Chicago Tribune, and named top player in SICA Blue. As a track & field participant, he was state qualifier.

College career
After high school, Campbell signed a letter of intent to play college football at the University of Notre Dame where he would play for coaches Bob Davie and Tyrone Willingham. He enrolled in College of Arts and Letters, majoring in English and computer applications. During his senior season at Notre Dame in 2002, Campbell started all 13 games and recorded 30  tackles (7 for a loss) and 5 sacks.

Professional career

Chicago Bears
Campbell was signed by Chicago Bears as an un-drafted rookie free agent and spent the 2005 season on the practice squad.

Cleveland Browns
Began the 2006 season with the Cleveland Browns, but was released.

Tampa Bay Buccaneers
Later in 2006, he was signed to the Tampa Bay Buccaneers practice squad.

Orlando Predators
Played for the Orlando Predators, of the Arena Football League, in 2008. During his 8 games with the Predators, he recorded 19 total tackles, 1.5 sacks and 1 fumble recovery.

Baltimore Ravens
After the AFL season, he went back to the NFL when he attended Baltimore Ravens training camp and played in pre-season games, but failed to make the team.

Montreal Alouettes
In 2009, Campbell signed with the Montreal Alouettes of the Canadian Football League. The Alouettes went on to have a great season, as they won the 97th Grey Cup. Campbell was released after the season.

Philadelphia Soul
In 2011, Campbell was signed by the Philadelphia Soul of the AFL.

Chicago Rush
Campbell was a member of the Chicago Rush in 2012 & 2013.

Arizona Rattlers
When the Rush was no longer included in the league's plan for 2014, their players were distributed in a dispersal draft, where Campbell was selected by the Arizona Rattlers.

Portland Thunder
On December 5, 2013, Campbell was traded by the Rattlers to the expansion Portland Thunder for future considerations.

References 

1981 births
Living people
Players of American football from Chicago
American football defensive linemen
Notre Dame Fighting Irish football players
Chicago Bears players
Tampa Bay Buccaneers players
Cleveland Browns players
Orlando Predators players
Montreal Alouettes players
Philadelphia Soul players
Chicago Rush players
Arizona Rattlers players
Portland Thunder players